Marat Rifkatovich Bikmaev (born 1 January 1986 in Tashkent) is an Uzbek football striker of Volga Tatar origin who plays for PFC Lokomotiv Tashkent in the Uzbek League.

Career

Club

Aktobe
On 20 June 2012 FC Aktobe announced the signing of Bikmaev.
His debut club goal was in his first official match in Kazakhstan Cup on 20 June 2012 against FC Lashyn.

International
As a member of the national team since his debut in 2004, he has played 38 matches and scored 5 goals (as of 16 November 2016).

Career statistics

Club

International

Statistics accurate as of match played 21 January 2019

International goals
Scores and results list Uzbekistan's goal tally first.

Honours

Club
Pakhtakor
 Uzbek League (3): 2002, 2003, 2004
 Uzbek Cup (3):  2002, 2003, 2004
 AFC Champions League semifinal (2): 2003, 2004

Alania Vladikavkaz
 Russian Cup runners-up (1): 2010–11
 Russian Football National League runners-up (1): 2011–12

Aktobe
 Kazakhstan Premier League (1): 2013

Lokomotiv
 Uzbek League (2): 2016, 2017, 2018
 Uzbek League runners-up (2): 2014, 2015
 Uzbek Cup (2):  2014, 2016

Individual
 Uzbekistan Player of the Year: 2017
 Uzbek League Top Scorer: 2017 (27 goals)

References

External links

 
 

1986 births
Living people
Volga Tatar people
Tatar sportspeople
Sportspeople from Tashkent
Uzbekistani footballers
Uzbekistani people of Russian descent
Uzbekistani people of Tatar descent
Uzbekistani expatriate footballers
Uzbekistan international footballers
2004 AFC Asian Cup players
2007 AFC Asian Cup players
2011 AFC Asian Cup players
Pakhtakor Tashkent FK players
PFC Krylia Sovetov Samara players
FC Rubin Kazan players
Uzbekistani expatriate sportspeople in Russia
PFC Spartak Nalchik players
Expatriate footballers in Russia
Russian Premier League players
FC Spartak Vladikavkaz players
Footballers at the 2006 Asian Games
Association football forwards
PFC Lokomotiv Tashkent players
FC Aktobe players
Uzbekistan Super League players
2019 AFC Asian Cup players
Asian Games competitors for Uzbekistan